The International Trophy is a prize awarded annually by the British Racing Drivers' Club to the winner of a motor race held at the Silverstone Circuit, England. For many years it formed the premier non-championship Formula One event in Britain, alongside the Race of Champions at Brands Hatch.

The event was instituted by the British Racing Drivers' Club (BRDC) in August 1949, sponsored by the Daily Express newspaper, for cars meeting contemporary Grand Prix motor racing regulations. The BRDC drew the name from that of an extinct event formerly held at the Brooklands circuit in the early 1930s. The first Silverstone event was noteworthy as it was the first to use the former airfield's perimeter roadways rather than the main runways; a circuit layout that persisted for over forty years.

With the introduction of the new World Championship, in 1950 the International Trophy became a non-championship race held to Formula One rules. The 1950 event was again held in August, but from 1951 onwards – apart from 1957 – the International Trophy was contested in April or May, near the beginning of the World Championship season. The timing of the event often attracted many top teams and drivers, allowing them to practise in racing conditions before the season became too serious. From 1952 the trophy was also sporadically opened to drivers in the Formula Two category, as well as being run to F2 regulations in those years that the World Championship was also. 1978 saw the 30th running of the International Trophy, and the last under these rules; with the increasing complexity of F1 cars it simply became too expensive for teams to contest non-championship events.

From 1979, the trophy continued as a Formula Two-only event. When F2 was replaced at the end of 1984, the trophy switched to the new Formula 3000 rules from 1985. In turn, it was replacement of F3000 by GP2 in 2005 that ended the International Trophy as an event for cutting-edge racing cars.

Since 2005 the trophy has been awarded to the winner of a race for historic F1 cars at the annual Silverstone Classic race meeting.

Winners of the International Trophy

1949–1980: Formula One years

Note that in 1952 and 1953, the race was run to Formula Two, while the 1961 race was held for the short lived Intercontinental Formula. The 1980 event formed a round of the 1980 British Formula One Championship.

1977–1984: Formula Two years

1985–2004: Formula 3000 years

2005 onward: Historic F1 years

2005: Thoroughbred Grand Prix
2006–2007, 2012: Masters Series
2008: FIA Historic F1

References
 (F3000 Results.)
 (F2 Results.)
 (Complete F1 Results.)